Porrona is a village in Tuscany, central Italy, administratively a frazione of the comune of Cinigiano, province of Grosseto. At the time of the 2001 census its population amounted to 24.

Porrona is about 40 km from Grosseto and 4 km from Cinigiano, and it is situated along the road which links the Cipressino Provincial Road at Sant'Angelo Scalo to Cinigiano.

History 
The village was born in the 13th century as a castle of the Republic of Siena.  It has become the seat of notable Sienese families since the 14th century (Piccolomini, Tolomei).

Main sights 
 Pieve of San Donato (13th century), main parish church of the village, it is a notable Romanesque architecture.
 Madonna delle Grazie (17th century), it was built as a chapel outside the walls.
 Castle of Porrona (13th century), ancient Sienese building, it was re-built in the 16th century after the annexation to the Grand Duchy of Tuscany. It was then restructured with Gothic Revival elements in the early 20th century.
 Walls of Porrona, old fortifications which surround the village since 13th century.

References

Bibliography 
  Emanuele Repetti, «Porrona», Dizionario Geografico Fisico Storico della Toscana, 1833–1846.
 Bruno Santi, Guida storico-artistica alla Maremma. Itinerari culturali nella provincia di Grosseto, Siena, Nuova Immagine, 1995, p. 175-178.
 Aldo Mazzolai, Guida della Maremma. Percorsi tra arte e natura, Florence, Le Lettere, 1997.
 Giuseppe Guerrini, Torri e castelli della provincia di Grosseto, Siena, Nuova Immagine, 1999.

See also 
 Borgo Santa Rita
 Castiglioncello Bandini
 Monticello Amiata
 Poggi del Sasso
 Sasso d'Ombrone

Frazioni of Cinigiano